Biggart is a surname. Notable people with the surname include:

Bill Biggart (1947–2001), American photojournalist
James Biggart (1878–1932), Tobagonian pharmacist
Mabelle Biggart (1861–?), American educator, preacher, and writer
Nicole W. Biggart, American academic